Prigi Arisandi (born 24-1-1976) is an Indonesian biologist and environmentalist. He graduated in biology from the Airlangga University. He was awarded the Goldman Environmental Prize in 2011, for his efforts on reducing industrial pollution of the Surabaya River.

References 

1976 births
Living people
Indonesian environmentalists
Goldman Environmental Prize awardees